Kiawenti:io Tarbell (born 28 April 2006), known mononymously as Kiawentiio, is a Canadian actress from Akwesasne, a reserve located along the Ontario–Quebec–New York border. She is best known for her role as Ka'kwet, a Mi'kmaq girl, in the third season of the Canadian television series Anne with an E. 

In 2020 Tarbell made her film debut in the titular role of Beans (2020). In August 2021, she was cast as Katara in the upcoming Netflix live-action remake of Avatar: The Last Airbender.

Early life and education 
Tarbell was born into a Mohawk family in Akwesasne, a First Nations reserve that is located on both sides of the Ontario–Quebec–New York border, spanning the St. Lawrence River. On the US side, it is also known as the St. Regis Mohawk Reservation.

Her first name means "nice morning" in Kanienʼkéha. Her parents are Barbara and Corey Tarbell. She grew up in a house on Kawehno:ke (also known as Cornwall Island) and attended Akwesasne Freedom School. She is based between Ottawa, Montreal, and New York, and has dual citizenship in Canada and the United States.

Career 
Tarbell was one of 200 indigenous Canadian actresses to audition for the role of Ka'kwet, who is featured in an indigenous story line in season 3 of Anne with an E. She had to learn to speak the Miꞌkmaq language and obtain an understanding of their tribe, history and culture. She also starred in the titular role of Beans as a 12-year-old Mohawk girl living in Kahnawake in 1990, at the time of the Oka Crisis.

She has appeared as recurring character Maya Thomas in the Peacock sitcom Rutherford Falls (2021). In 2021, she was also selected to portray Katara in the upcoming Netflix live-action version of Avatar: The Last Airbender series.

Filmography

Film

Television

Awards and nominations

References

External links

2006 births
Living people
Actresses from Ontario
Akwesasne
Canadian child actresses
Canadian Mohawk people
First Nations actresses
21st-century First Nations people
Canadian film actresses
Canadian television actresses
21st-century Canadian actresses